Hilltop Hospital (French: Hôpital Hilltop) is a claymation television series made in 1999, directed by Pascal Le Nôtre. It is adapted from a series of books by Nicholas Allan of the same name.

The theme tune and incidental music for the English version of the series was composed by Ben Heneghan and Ian Lawson who also composed the music for the original and mid-2000s Fireman Sam series and Joshua Jones.

List of characters
The hospital is staffed by adult animals with mainly young animals as patients. Regular characters include:
 Dr. Matthews, a dog, who seeks the romantic attention of surgeon Sally.
 Nurse Kitty, a cat, who seeks the romantic attention of Dr. Matthews, who for the most part appears not to notice.
 Surgeon Sally, a hippo, a workaholic surgeon who has no time for Dr Matthews' attention.
 Clare and Arthur, two rats, who provide technical and laboratory services.
 Dr Atticus, a tortoise, the anesthetist who often is sleeping.
 The two Teds, two identical twin bears, who drive the hospital ambulance and work as orderlies.

The English-language version featured the voices of Kevin Whately (Dr. Matthews), Sally Ann Marsh (nurse Kitty), Celia Imrie (surgeon Sally), Paul Shane (the two Teds), Brian Murphy (Dr. Atticus), Julie Higginson (Clare the lab rat) and Jonathan Kydd (Arthur the lab rat). Guest voices included Dame Thora Hird as Gracey Greyshell in Gracey Greyshell's last day.

Episodes

Season 1 (1999)
 Heart Trouble (30 September 1999)
 Easter Bunnies (1 October 1999)
 Blood Bank (2 October 1999)
 The Big Event (4 October 1999)
 Rag Week at Hilltop (5 October 1999)
 The Big Match (6 October 1999)
 Gracey Greyshell's Last Day (7 October 1999)
 Fire Alert (8 October 1999)
 Happy Birthday, Dr. Matthews! (11 October 1999)
 The Mystery Illness (12 October 1999)
 Radio Hilltop (13 October 1999)
 Nurse Kitty's a Star (14 October 1999)
 The Ghost of Hilltop
 Blind as a Bat
 Accidents Will Happen
 Lift-off at Hilltop
 A Perfect Wedding
 Flower-Power
 Dogs Dinner
 Weasel Kneasal
 Mouth-to-Mouth
 All Creatures Great and Small
 Butterflies in My Tummy
 The Bear Who Wouldn't Share
 Press-ups and Bunny Hops
 Pamela's Secret

Season 2 (2001)
 Secret Beds (3 september 2001)
 Saving Your Bacon
 Teething Trouble
 The Hyper Hedgehog
 Lazy Eye
 Laughter is the Best Medecine
 Bully For You
 Hot and Bothered
 Nits
 Nightmare at Hilltop
 A Good Sketch
 Fond Memory
 C-C-Caspar
 Smoke Gets in Your Eyes
 Safety First
 Wee Trouble
 Testing Time
 Earache at Hilltop
 Larger Than Life (10 October 2001)
 Smile (13 October 2001)
 New Talent (15 October 2001)
 Skin Deep
 An Extra Pair of Hands
 Siamese Twins
 Cold Feet (21 October 2001)
 The Blues (23 October 2001)

Development
The series is co-produced by British company Siriol Productions and French companies Folimage and EVA Entertainment (season 1) for France 3, Canal J, ITV, and German network ZDF, with Buena Vista Home Entertainment handling all European video rights. The first season was pre-sold to Canal J for an air date in 1999, while France 3 would air the series in the Spring of 2000.

References

External links
Hilltop Hospital at itv.com/citv

Episode list
Hilltop Hospital

1990s British children's television series
2000s British children's television series
1999 British television series debuts
2001 British television series endings
British children's animated comedy television series
French children's animated comedy television series
BAFTA winners (television series)
Clay animation television series
English-language television shows
French-language television shows
Fictional hippopotamuses
Fictional dogs
Fictional cats
Fictional mice and rats
Fictional bears
Fictional hospitals
1990s British animated television series
1990s French animated television series
ITV children's television shows
1990s British medical television series
2000s British medical television series